Martin Maloney Cottage is located in Spring Lake, Monmouth County, New Jersey, United States. The building was added to the National Register of Historic Places on October 26, 1992.

See also
National Register of Historic Places listings in Monmouth County, New Jersey

References

Houses on the National Register of Historic Places in New Jersey
Queen Anne architecture in New Jersey
Houses in Monmouth County, New Jersey
National Register of Historic Places in Monmouth County, New Jersey
Spring Lake, New Jersey
New Jersey Register of Historic Places